Au is a town in the Kankan Region of eastern Guinea, north of the Niger River.

Populated places in the Kankan Region